USS Commodore may refer to the following ships of the United States Navy:

 , a side wheel steamer, was built at New Orleans, Louisiana, in 1863
 , built in 1875 at Cleveland, Ohio
 , a motorboat, served in the Navy during 1917–1919
 , a landlocked training ship used during World War II

United States Navy ship names